Akalın is a village in Yüksekova District in Hakkâri Province in Turkey. The village is populated by Kurds of the Pinyanişî tribe and had a population of 1,610 in 2021.

History 
It was populated by 22 Assyrian families in 1850 and 10 families in 1877.

Population 
Population history of the village from 2000 to 2022:

References 

Villages in Yüksekova District
Kurdish settlements in Hakkâri Province
Historic Assyrian communities in Turkey